Strathy is a scattered community in Sutherland in the Scottish Highlands.

Strathy is on the north coast of Scotland, on the A836 road some twenty miles west of Thurso. The village itself includes at least three distinct areas:
Strathy East (on the right-hand side when passing through the village in the direction of Bettyhill, accessed by two roads leading towards Strathy Beach),
Strathy West (immediately to the south of Strathy East)
Strathy Point.

These generally enclose the rest of the village, mainly comprising Steven Terrace. If welcoming signposts are taken to represent the limits of the village, Strathy is contained in these areas. However, some would say that Strathy also takes in the settlement of Baligill to the east, and also Brawl, Aultiphurst and Laidnagullin to the west, essentially the entire community found between the Baligill Burn and the Armadale 'Big' Burn.

The Church of Scotland at Strathy has a prominent position as you drive into the village from the east.

Climate

References

Populated places in Sutherland
Parish of Farr